is the informal name for the area surrounding Tamachi Station in Minato, Tokyo, generally referring to the districts of Shiba, Shibaura, and Mita.

History
During the Edo period Tamachi was a hatamoto residential quarter. Rice cultivation did not begin in the area until the Meiji period. Today the area is entirely urbanized.

Surroundings
The headquarters of several major companies and organizations are located in this area, including Nippon Kinzoku, Morinaga, and NEC. Also in this area is Tokyo International School. The landmark Rainbow Bridge can be accessed on foot, 15-minutes from Tamachi station crossing some scenic canals in the process.

See also
 Tsuki no Misaki

Neighborhoods of Tokyo
Geography of Minato, Tokyo